Beach volleyball competitions at the 2011 Pan American Games in Guadalajara were held from October 17 to October 23 at the Pan American Beach Volleyball Stadium in Puerto Vallarta.

Medal summary

Medal table

Events

Qualification
64 athletes will compete (32 male and 32 female). Each nation is allowed to enter a maximum of one pair in each event. Mexico as hosts gets one spot automatically in each events, while the top ten nations from the North American and the top five from South American rankings on June 30, 2011, will also qualify from each gender.

Qualification summary

References

 
Events at the 2011 Pan American Games
P
2011
Qualification for the 2011 Pan American Games